Brooklyn is a borough of New York City.

Brooklyn may also refer to:

Places

Australia
Brooklyn, Victoria, a suburb of Melbourne
Brooklyn, New South Wales, a fishing town on the edge Sydney
Brooklyn, Tasmania a suburb of Burnie
Brooklyn Park, South Australia, a suburb of Adelaide
Brooklyn Sanctuary, a nature reserve of Queensland

Canada
Brooklyn, Newfoundland and Labrador, a settlement in Newfoundland and Labrador
Brooklyn, Yarmouth County, Nova Scotia, a small village north of Yarmouth
Brooklyn, Queens County, Nova Scotia, a village near Liverpool
Brooklyn, Hants County, Nova Scotia, a rural community located in western Hants County
Brooklyn, Prince Edward Island, one of two settlements

Netherlands
Breukelen, a town north-west of Utrecht

New Zealand
Brooklyn, Wellington, a suburb of Wellington
Brooklyn (New Zealand electorate), a parliamentary constituency
Brooklyn, Tasman District, a settlement and rural valley in the Tasman District

South Africa
Brooklyn, Pretoria, a suburb of Pretoria
Brooklyn, Cape Town, a suburb of Cape Town

United States
Brooklyn (Jacksonville), a neighborhood of Jacksonville, Florida
Brooklyn, California, former city annexed to Oakland
Brooklyn, California, former name of Red Dog, California
Brooklyn, Connecticut, a New England town
Brooklyn (CDP), Connecticut, the central village in the town
Brooklyn Green Historic District, at the center of the village
Brooklyn (Waterbury), a neighborhood of Waterbury, Connecticut
Brooklyn, a settlement that eventually became Dayton, Kentucky
Brooklyn, Illinois
Brooklyn, Indiana
Brooklyn, Iowa
Brooklyn, Baltimore, a neighborhood in Baltimore, Maryland 
Brooklyn Park, Maryland, in Anne Arundel County but adjacent to Brooklyn, Baltimore
Brooklyn, Michigan
Brooklyn, an early name for the settlement that eventually became Minneapolis, Minnesota
Brooklyn Center, Minnesota (derived from Minneapolis)
Brooklyn Park, Minnesota (derived from Minneapolis)
Brooklyn, Missouri
Brooklyn, East Otto, New York, a hamlet in Cattaraugus County
Brooklyn, Franklin, Delaware County, New York, a former hamlet
Brooklyn, a neighborhood in Charlotte, North Carolina
Brooklyn, part of Glenwood-Brooklyn Historic District in Raleigh, North Carolina
Brooklyn, Ohio
Old Brooklyn, Cleveland, Ohio
Brooklyn, Portland, Oregon
Brooklyn, Washington
Brooklyn, West Virginia (disambiguation)
Brooklyn, Wisconsin (disambiguation) 
Brooklyn, Dane County, Wisconsin
Brooklyn, Green County, Wisconsin
Brooklyn, Green Lake County, Wisconsin
Brooklyn, Washburn County, Wisconsin
Brooklyn Township (disambiguation)

Arts and entertainment

Film and television
 Brooklyn (film), a 2015 film based on Colm Tóibín's novel (see below)
 Brooklyn Nine-Nine, an American police procedural sitcom airing from 2013-2021
 Wyatt Cenac: Brooklyn, a standup comedy special by Wyatt Cenac
 Brooklyn, a Gargoyles character
 Brooklyn Masefield, a Beyblade character

Songs
"Brooklyn", by Jesse Malina from The Fine Art of Self Destruction, 2002
"Brooklyn", by Mos Def from Black on Both Sides, 1999
"Brooklyn", by Woodkid from Iron, 2011
"Brooklyn", by the Youngblood Brass Band from Center:Level:Roar, 2003
"Brooklyn (If You See Something, Say Something)", by Taking Back Sunday from Louder Now, 2006

Other media
 Brooklyn (musical), a 2004 Broadway musical
 Brooklyn (novel), a 2009 novel by Colm Tóibín

People
Brooklyn (given name)
Mary J. Blige (b. 1971), singer who uses the moniker "Brook Lynn" when rapping

Ships
USS Brooklyn, various ships
Brooklyn, which brought Mormon pioneers to San Francisco in 1846

Sports

American football
Brooklyn Dodgers (AAFC), 1946 to 1949
Brooklyn Dodgers (NFL), 1930 to 1944
Brooklyn Lions / Horsemen (1926), a National Football League and first American Football League merged franchise
Brooklyn Tigers, later Rochester Tigers, members of the second American Football League 1936–1937

Other sports
Brooklyn (cycling team), an Italian professional cycling team 1970–1977
Brooklyn Dodgers, Major League Baseball team that became the Los Angeles Dodgers in 1958
Brooklyn Nets, a professional basketball team in the NBA
Brooklyn, a term used in bowling

Other uses
Brooklyn (cocktail), a whiskey cocktail
Apache Brooklyn, software in Apache Incubator

See also
Breukelen (disambiguation)
Brookland (disambiguation)
Brooklin (disambiguation)
Brookline (disambiguation)
Brooklyn Avenue (disambiguation)
Brooklyn Brewery
Brooklyn chewing gum, manufactured by Perfetti Van Melle
Brooklyn College